The Gods We Can Touch is the third studio album by Norwegian singer-songwriter and record producer Aurora. It was released on 21 January 2022 by Decca and Glassnote Records. As in her other releases, Aurora worked with Magnus Skylstad and Askjell Solstrand, along with new collaborations with Jamie Hartman, Martin Sjølie and Matias Tellez on its production.

Conceived as a departure from the concept and sound of her previous works, The Gods We Can Touch has been characterised to be an electropop record, along with folk-pop, ethereal, art pop, electro-folk, and synth-pop. Its sound incorporates an eclectic and multifaceted style with electronic textures, Western elements, and intimate orchestrations. Inspired predominantly by Greek mythology, the lyrics explore themes of self-empowerment, abuse, heartbreak, morality and desire, with a maximal and introspective style. The Gods We Can Touch received critical acclaim upon release, with music critics praising its "ethereal" vocal performance and experimental musical direction.

The Gods We Can Touch was supported by eight singles, four of which were supplemented by music videos. "Exist for Love" was promoted by an online music festival organized by Aurora. "Cure for Me", "Giving in to the Love", and "Heathens" were released between October and December 2021. "A Dangerous Thing" and "Everything Matters", featuring French singer Pomme, were released as a double single. "A Temporary High" followed alongside the album's release. The record debuted atop the Norwegian albums chart as Aurora's second number-one album in Norway, while also reaching the top ten in Scotland, the United Kingdom, and the US Billboard Heatseekers Albums chart. To further promote the album, Aurora performed several songs at the concert film A Touch of the Divine and embarked on her fourth headlining concert tour.

Background and recording

Aurora began writing songs for the album in January 2019, right after she chose the title for her new record. According to her, two days after the release of her second studio album A Different Kind of Human (Step 2) (2019), she already had planned what she wanted for her next project. During the writing process she read about the history of religion, which was a source of inspiration for the themes of the album.

Aurora stated in an interview with Billboard Japan that production for two upcoming albums began in November 2019, one of them being the yet-untitled The Gods We Can Touch. In an interview with Riff Magazine, she revealed that the closer album had a bigger perspective in comparison to her previous efforts, concluding that "it's an album for every individual within the big army of love." She further detailed the album in an interview with Motley, adding that it "will be dressed in an armour of hardness. But I'm also really exploring the soft, delicate part of me."

The first recorded song for the album was "Exist for Love", which was recorded in January 2020 at the Office in Norway, a month before the COVID-19 pandemic was declared in Norway. The track was made in collaboration with Isobel Waller-Bridge, who contributed with string arrangements. In November 2020, Aurora rented Barony Rosendal to record The Gods We Can Touch. Other recording locations included The Jungle and Blanca Studio, all located in Norway. In April 2021, Aurora's single "Runaway" began growing in popularity on TikTok. In an interview with NME regarding the song's newfound success, Aurora described the themes of the upcoming album: "I'm asking questions to everything that made us the way we are now; in our past, in politics, religion, and in weird ways of thought we have created that make no sense – like racism, not being a feminist or burning women for being witches. All of these strange things that we have convinced ourselves are the right thing to do, which is just so odd." She later stated in July 2021 that album was finished, and her intentions to release the album before the end of 2021.

Music and lyrics

Overview
The Gods We Can Touch has been characterised to be an electropop record, along with folk-pop, ethereal, art pop, electro-folk, and synth-pop. The sound of the album incorporates an eclectic and multifaceted style, set with vast soundscapes, electronic textures, Western elements, intimate orchestrations, multiple layers, and textures. Musical influences of the record draws from a wide range of genres, such as jazz, chamber pop, global music, Latin music, and arena rock. Aurora classified the album as its own genre due to its "chaotic" and "genre blending" sound.

Marcy Donelson of AllMusic stated that "The Gods We Can Touch mixes natural, live-sounding vocals and acoustic instrumental performances with ethereal processed harmonies, drum machines, synthesizers, and various programming." The tracks "Exist for Love" and Artemis" were the only songs recorded on first takes, which "commit[ted] to a more spontaneous sound." Aurora's sopranolike vocal performance throughout the album was described by many critics as "ethereal", with interludes to songs that showcase her voice and vocal tone shifts. Georgia Griffiths from The Music wrote that Aurora is "channelling Lana Del Rey, [and] the next it's Santigold" in her vocal performances on the record.

A concept album like Aurora's previous releases, The Gods We Can Touch deviates from the concepts found on her tribal-inspired EP Infections of a Different Kind (Step 1) (2018) and album A Different Kind of Human (Step 2) (2019), in which she explored themes of empowerment, politics and ecological crisis. Described by her as "chapter three of my life", she revealed to be going to a more experimental direction with the album, and stated that it would not discuss themes like "doom, gloom, COVID and horror", instead of focusing on "more playful and fun" songs, whilst also referencing "a lot of things that bother [her] with society and our history". The lyrical themes are heavily inspired predominantly by Greek mythology, though Aurora acknowledged that some of them have references to Abrahamic and ancient Roman religions. Furthermore, the styles of lyrical writing have been described as dark and disturbing, with a maximal and introspective style. The lyrics throughout the songs of the record also talk about self-empowerment, abuse, heartbreak, morality and desire.

Songs

The Gods We Can Touch opens with "The Forbidden Fruits of Eden", an interlude that takes its title from the forbidden fruit of the Garden of Eden that appeared in the biblical book of Genesis. Composed of delicate harmonies, it "set[s] an explicitly religious tone" for the rest of the album. The electronica and chamber pop ballad "Everything Matters" features French singer-songwriter Pomme with a spoken word outro in French language. Inspired by the myth of Prometheus and the creation of humanity from clay, "Giving in to the Love", questions obsession with body image, while . It incorporates electropop and power pop genres and contains tom tom strikes, a drum machine and echoey synths.  The baroque pop track "You Keep Me Crawling" deals with abuse of power in relationships where Aurora conveys "intensity and power in her vocals, while also showing vulnerability and softer moments."

Aurora called "Exist for Love" her first love song. It is a dreamy, retro-styled ballad accompanied by acoustic guitar and backing harmonies that moves into a soaring, strings-swept melody as she declares her love to her lover. The following track, "The Innocent", is an upbeat dance-pop and house song with a Latin rhythm that is accompanied by syncopated chordal piano, brass and pizzicato strings. Its production was described to be "harking back to the 1920s Jazz Age conventions, yet being undercut with a more current EDM feel." "Exhale Inhale", a stark contrast to the previous song, contains a folk-inspired sound. The track discusses the fear of several environmental issues "that awaits us" like wildfires and pollution. "A Temporary High" has an 1980s-influenced synth-pop sound that breaks into a thumping electro beat.

In "A Dangerous Thing", Aurora reflects on an abusive relationship, referencing the goddess of seduction Peitho, and showcases tone shifts from light harmonies to deeper verses. The dark sonority of the song is backed by an acoustic guitar, light chimes and minimal drumming. "Blood in the Wine" opens with a war cry reminiscent of The Good, the Bad and the Ugly against gentle acoustic guitar and thunderous percussion as it builds into a "collosus roar". An electropop track, which was compared to the music of Fleetwood Mac, "This Could Be a Dream" is a subdued ballad driven by "a flowing melody over a slow beat", piano, orchestral strings and trumpets that talks about "finding strength when you have nothing left to give." The Gods We Can Touch closes with the folk and orchestral pop cut "A Little Place Called the Moon". One of her favourite songs from the album, Aurora felt that it was the "perfect ending" for the album.

Release and promotion
After clearing her Instagram feed in May 2020, Aurora began hinting at "the beginning of a new era". She initially expected to release the album in that year but she revealed in a September 2020 interview her decision to postpone it due to the COVID-19 pandemic. The next year, the album was delayed to early 2022, following the commercial success of her 2015 single "Runaway". On 14 October 2021, she revealed the album's name and track listing.

In July 2020 Aurora organized the Exist for Love Sessions, an online music festival that promoted various emerging artists. She later appeared at the Late Night with Seth Meyers in November 2021, her first performance at that show since 2018. In promotion of the album's release in the United Kingdom, Aurora performed at two sold-out shows in London. She was also interviewed by Norwegian TV host Anne Lindmo and performed "A Temporary High" in her talk show Lindmo, which was broadcast by NRK.

Singles
Aurora decided to release "Exist for Love" as the album's first single on 14 May 2020 because she felt "the world needs more love than ever". "Cure for Me" was released as The Gods We Can Touchs next single on 7 July 2021.

On 14 October, she released "Giving in to the Love" as the album's next single, and officially announced The Gods We Can Touch, and its release date of 21 January 2022. On 2 December, she released "Heathens" was released as the album's fourth single. "A Dangerous Thing" was released as a double single on 7 January 2022 with "Everything Matters", featuring French singer Pomme, as a B-side. The latter song was released as a promotional single only. 

"A Temporary High" served as the seventh single, released on 21 January 2022, alongside the album's release. A music video was released on 27 January 2022. "The Woman I Am", initially a vinyl-exclusive track, it was officially released on 4 April 2022 as the record's eighth single.

Concert film and tour
On 3 December 2021, Aurora announced a virtual concert film titled A Touch of the Divine, released exclusively to Moment House on 25 January 2022, a week later after the album was released. It was directed by Alexandra Green and produced by Bullion Productions and Mercury Studios. A teaser was posted on 18 January 2022, while an official trailer was released two days later. Described as a "worldwide digital experience", the film included six songs from the album that were accompanied by choreography and interludes spoken by Aurora herself.

The album received further promotion from her fourth headlining concert tour, which was announced on 9 July 2021. The tour will span across Europe and North America, starting on 13 February 2022 in Milan, Italy, and set to conclude on 12–13 September in Barcelona, Spain. The second leg of the tour visited North America in May and June 2022.

Critical reception

The Gods We Can Touch was met with critical acclaim upon release. At Metacritic, which assigns a normalised score out of 100 to ratings from publications, the album received a mean score of 81 based on 9 reviews, indicating "universal acclaim".

The Line of Best Fit writer Tom Williams praised the album as an "ethereal masterpiece" and stated that Aurora's sound is "like heaven on Earth." Steven Loftin of Dork called Aurora on the album "exciting as she is intriguing" and makes the "world feels like a better place." Clashs Finlay Holden called the record "high-reaching" and noted that the themes of "angry, celebratory, wallowing and cathartic energies exhibit themselves in a maximalist way." Ben Hogwood from musicOMH states that the record consisted of "futuristic production and intriguing, sometimes daring melodies" despite being rooted in a "deep and very distant past."

Chris Hamilton-Peach of DIY writes that "Aurora's celestial spark remains her calling card" on the album. Gigwise writer Tom Taylor sees Aurora as she "experiments with genre in her joyful new album" while also being reliant on "high-energy, electro-pop anthems." Andrew Trendell of NME notes that the record "seizes the opportunity to take the world on and fight with all her power" and is loaded with "idiosyncratic quirks and enchanting notions." Hayden Godfrey from Under the Radar felt that the record showcases Aurora's "glorious highs and careful lows" towards the production. Ewan Gleadow from Cult Following says that Aurora "relies entirely on the fascinatingly lucid vocal range she holds." According to Marcy Donelson from AllMusic, the record only expands on Aurora's "already mystical bearing."

Commercial performance
Upon its release, The Gods We Can Touch became the third most-streamed album on Spotify that week with over 60 million streams on the platform. The album debuted atop the Norwegian VG-lista chart, marking Aurora's second number one on the chart. In the United States, the record peaked at numbers six and 56 on Billboards Top Heatseekers and Top Current Album Sales charts, respectively.

Track listing
All tracks produced by Aurora and Magnus Skylstad, except where noted.

Notes
  signifies a co-producer.
 Vinyl releases of the album that include the alternative track listing have different versions of some of its tracks.

Personnel
Credits adapted from the CD liner notes of The Gods We Can Touch.

Musicians

 Aurora Aksnes – vocals ; piano ; percussion ; synthesizer ; organ 
 Magnus Skylstad – synth bass ; synthesizer ; organ ; drums ; bass ; synth pads , strings ; percussion ; baritone guitar, piano 
 Fredrik Svabø – guitar ; acoustic guitar 
 Askjell Solstrand – piano ; co-production 
 Pomme – vocals 
 Alexander von Mehren – drum machine 
 Isobel Waller-Bridge – string arrangement 
 Glen Roberts – acoustic guitar 
 Maddie Cutter – cello 
 Galya Bisengalieva – violin, viola 
 Odd Martin Skålnes – guitar, percussion 
 Martin Sjølie – electric guitar, drums, bass 
 Matias Tellez – guitar, synthesizer 
 Per Arne Glorvigen – bandoneon

Technical

 Aurora – production 
 Magnus Skylstad – production ; programming ; engineering , mixing, recording engineer 
 Jamie Hartman – production 
 Martin Sjølie – co-production 
 Alex Whartman – mastering 
 Josh Gudwin – mixing 
 Robin Schmidt – mastering

Design
 Aurora – art direction
 Leif Podhajsky – art direction, artwork, package design
 Xin Li – photography

Charts

Release history

See also
 List of number-one albums in Norway

References

2022 albums
Albums postponed due to the COVID-19 pandemic
Aurora (singer) albums
Albums produced by Magnus Skylstad
Decca Records albums
Ethereal wave albums
Glassnote Records albums